Maysoon al-Eryani (born 24 November 1987) is a poet and translator from Yemen, who writes in Arabic and English. She was born in Sana'a and has a BA in English Literature from Sana'a University.

Publications
The Mysterious side of paradise (2013).
Madad (2010)
Gold Pendants (2010)
I'll Break the Sky by Lovers (2009)
As Long as my Heart (2008)

Associations
Member of the Union of the Yemeni Writers and Authors.
Member of the Yemeni Women's Association.
Member of the literary fonxe association.

Awards
Al Makaleh prize for Arabic literature" poetry” 2013
President's prize for young poets 2010/2009
First prize, poetry competition 2007. Sana'a University
First prize, poetry competition 2006, University of Science and Technology.
Honored in 2010 by Poets Without Borders.

References

External links
Al-Eryani wishes for more engagement in cultural institutions (interview)

Yemeni women poets
Living people
1987 births
Sanaa University alumni
Yemeni poets